In database theory and knowledge representation, the one of the certain answers is the set of answers to a given query consisting of the intersection of all the complete databases that are consistent with a given knowledge base. The notion of certain answer, investigated in database theory since the 1970s, is indeed defined in the context of open world assumption, where the given knowledge base is assumed to be incomplete.

Intuitively, certain answers are the answers that are always returned when quering a given knowledge base, considering both the extensional knowledge that the possible implications inferred by automatic reasoning, regardless of the specific interpretation.

Definition 
In literature, the set of certain answers is usually defined as follows:

where:
  is a query
  is an incomplete database
  is any complete database consistent with 
  is the semantics of 

In description logics, such set may be defined in a similar way as follows:
Where:
  is the alphabet of constants (individuals or values) of the ontology;

See also 
 Open world assumption
 Closed world assumption
 Completeness (knowledge bases)

References

Further reading 
 
 
 
 
 

Knowledge representation